Parnassia fimbriata is a species of flowering plant in the family Celastraceae known by the common name fringed grass of Parnassus. It is native to western North America from Alaska and northwestern Canada to the southern Rocky Mountains, where it is a plant of alpine and subalpine environments.

It is a perennial herb producing an erect flowering stem from a patch of basal leaves. The leaf has a rounded blade at the end of a long petiole, the leaf reaching a total of up to 16 centimeters long. The inflorescence may be up to 40 centimeters tall and consists of a mostly naked peduncle with one clasping bract midway up.

The single flower has five small jagged sepals behind five veined, fringed white petals each roughly a centimeter long. At the center of the flower are five stamens and five staminodes with edges of many narrow, round-tipped lobes.

External links
Jepson Manual Treatment
Southwest Colorado Wildflowers
Photo gallery

fimbriata
Alpine flora
Flora of the Western United States
Flora of California
Flora of the Sierra Nevada (United States)
Flora of the Rocky Mountains
Flora without expected TNC conservation status